Nocardiopsis is a bacterial genus from the family of Nocardiopsaceae which can produces some antimicrobial compounds, including thiopeptides.  Nocardiopsis occur mostly in saline and alkaline soils.

References

Further reading 
 
 
 
 
 
 
 
 
 

Actinomycetales
Bacteria genera